Richard Stuart Jones (born 28 March 1983) is a Welsh International Master from Swansea, Wales.  Jones first became Welsh Chess Champion in 2002 and held the title again in 2003, 2009 (shared with Ioan Rees), 2010, 2012 (shared with Tim Kett) and 2013. Jones has played in chess Olympiads for Wales in 2000, 2002, 2004, 2006, 2008, 2010, 2012, 2014 and 2016.

References

External links

Living people
1983 births
Welsh chess players
Chess Olympiad competitors
Chess International Masters
Sportspeople from Swansea